Josef Steinbach (21 March 1879 – 15 January 1937) was an Austrian weightlifter. He was born in Bohemia and in 1894 moved to Vienna, where he began competing in weightlifting in 1898. He won three world titles in 1904–1905 and two medals at the 1906 Intercalated Games: a gold in one-hand and a silver in two-hand lift. After the Games he became professional wrestler and exhibition weightlifter. In 1910 he repeatedly challenged Arthur Saxon for the world professional weightlifting title, but to no avail.

Steinbach set several world records. In particular, his one-hand lift of 106 kg remained unbeaten until the 1930s. In 1924 he appeared in the silent film The City Without Jews.

Steinbach died in 1937 and was survived by son Leopold. The same year a large granite monument was built in his honor, sponsored by a group of Austrian and German weightlifters and wrestlers.

References

1879 births
1937 deaths
Austrian male weightlifters
Olympic weightlifters of Austria
Weightlifters at the 1906 Intercalated Games
Medalists at the 1906 Intercalated Games
World Weightlifting Championships medalists
People associated with physical culture
People from Horšovský Týn
German Bohemian people
Austrian people of German Bohemian descent